Under a Blood Red Sky is a live album by Irish rock band U2, produced by Jimmy Iovine and released on 21 November 1983. The record's eight tracks were compiled from three concerts during the group's 1983 War Tour, including two songs from their 5 June performance at Red Rocks Amphitheatre. The concert film U2 Live at Red Rocks: Under a Blood Red Sky, recorded at the same Red Rocks show, was released as a companion to the live album. Both releases helped establish U2's reputation globally as a renowned live act.

History
The album consists of live recordings from three shows on the band's War Tour, from Colorado and Boston in the US and from Germany.

An accompanying concert video entitled Live at Red Rocks: Under a Blood Red Sky was released the following year. The film was recorded entirely at the outdoor Red Rocks Amphitheatre on 5 June 1983, while two songs from that show are included on the album.

The title is taken from the lyrics of the song "New Year's Day", originally released on U2's War album.

The album was re-released on 29 September 2008 as a remastered CD with a DVD of the Red Rocks concert.

Track listing

Notes
During the performance of "The Electric Co.", Bono included a 27-second snippet of Stephen Sondheim's "Send in the Clowns". When Under a Blood Red Sky was released, U2 failed to get permission and pay the appropriate licensing and royalty fees to include Sondheim's tune on the album. When Sondheim objected, U2 agreed to pay a $50,000 (US) penalty for the unauthorized use and to press all future releases with a new version that did not include the snippet.

Essentially, there are now two versions of the vinyl album: the original with the full "The Electric Co." running 5:18 and the edited version which runs 4:51. However, the various CDs pressed around the world all vary in the versions of the song that are included.

The trifold digipack CD pressed in the U.S. correctly lists "The Electric Co." at 4:51 and contains the edited version of the song.
Later U.S. CD pressings in the standard jewel box format incorrectly list "The Electric Co." at 5:18, but have the edited version of the song.
Some, and perhaps all, European pressings of the CD correctly list "The Electric Co." at 5:18 and have the unedited version of the song (the same is likely true of other worldwide CD pressings).
An Australian pressing of the CD lists the track at 4:57, but the song actually runs the full 5:18.
The remastered editions all contain the edited version of the song.

Personnel
Bono – lead vocals
The Edge – guitar, keyboards, backing vocals, bass guitar on "40"
Adam Clayton – bass guitar, guitar on "40"
Larry Mullen Jr. – drums

Charts

Weekly charts

Year-end charts

Certifications

See also
U2 discography

References

External links
Under a Blood Red Sky on U2.com

Albums produced by Jimmy Iovine
U2 live albums
1983 live albums
Albums recorded at Red Rocks Amphitheatre